"Performing Society: The Violence of Gender" was an art exhibition, hosted in Tai Kwun, Hong Kong from 16 February to 28 April 2019. The artist panel was held on 7 March 2019. It discussed how the themes of gender and violence intersect.

Artists
There were 11 artists from around the world featured in the exhibit. Ten are female and one is male.

Participating artists

 Dong Jinling
 Jana Euler
 Anne Imhof
 Oliver Laric
 Liu Yefu
Ma Qiusha
 Julia Phillips
 Pamela Rosenkranz
 Marianna Simnett
 Raphaela Vogel
 Wong Ping

Reception
Rachel Cheung of the South China Morning Post reviewed the exhibition. She stated that "Tai Kwun should be applauded for putting up a show on the timely topic" and that publicly discussing the subject brings progress on the matter. Cheung argued that the protagonist of the animation Who’s the Daddy, a 2017 short film by Wong Ping, reflects misogyny in regards to bodies and that the work overall "feels out of place in the exhibition."

References

External links
 
 

Art exhibitions in China
2019 in Hong Kong